Merle Norman Stadium is a beach volleyball facility located in Los Angeles, California, United States. The on-campus USC facility, built in 2013, serves as the home of the USC Trojans women's beach volleyball team. The facility has three sand courts where USC plays its home matches and holds practices.

History 
Ground was broken to construct the venue in July 2012 from donations of several USC alumni, including Jack and Helen Nethercutt. The stadium opened on March 7, 2013, and was named after Merle Norman.

The Trojans went undefeated at the stadium in 2014, 2015, and 2017. As of July 2020, the Trojans are 34–4 at the stadium.

Events
The women's beach volleyball team played their first dual match in the stadium on March 10, 2013, versus Loyola Marymount. 

The 2016 Pac-12 Conference beach volleyball championships were held at the stadium, which the USC Trojans won.

Gallery

See also
USC Trojans
Merle Norman

References

External links
Merle Norman Stadium at usctrojans.com

College beach volleyball venues in the United States
USC Trojans women's beach volleyball venues
USC Trojans sports venues
Volleyball venues in Los Angeles
Sports venues completed in 2013
2013 establishments in California
Nethercutt-Richards family